The Giants series is a group of five science fiction novels by James P. Hogan, beginning with his first novel, 1977's Inherit the Stars.

Origins
Hogan revealed in the introduction to the omnibus edition The Two Moons,  that Inherit the Stars was inspired by a viewing of the film 2001: A Space Odyssey (1968) which he enjoyed until the ending. Complaining about what he saw as the confusing, effects-heavy conclusion at work afterwards, each of his colleagues bet him five pounds that he couldn't write and publish a science-fiction novel. The result was Inherit the Stars, which was published by Del Rey Books in May 1977. He later asked Arthur C. Clarke about the meaning of the ending of 2001, to which Clarke reportedly replied that while the ending of Hogan's Inherit the Stars made more sense, the ending of 2001 made more money.

Background
The series is notable for its creation of a substantial prehistory of the Solar System, stretching back millions of years. This was further expanded in later books to include an alternate universe version of the setting.

Primary Chronology
 25 million years ago: Intelligence arises in the Solar System on the planet Minerva, in the form of the "Giants". Minerva is orbited by one moon and orbits the Sun between Mars and Jupiter.
 Between 25 million and 4 million years ago: Carbon dioxide levels in the Minervan atmosphere begin to rise. As the Giants have a low tolerance for carbon dioxide, they send a scientific team to the star Iscaris to perform experiments to aid in their understanding of the situation. However, the experimentation destabilizes the star, causing a nova. The team attempts to flee on their starship Shapieron which is unable to decelerate (due to a problem with the ship's main drives), forcing them to orbit the Solar System at relativistic velocities, experiencing one year for every million that pass. After the events at Iscaris, the Ganymeans bring in animals and hominids from Earth in the hope of isolating the gene responsible for carbon dioxide tolerance. However, they fear the effects of using this gene in themselves and are forced to flee to the distant planet of Thurien, in orbit around the "Giants' Star". They leave behind relays so that they can continue to observe Minerva and their evacuation is mostly successful, though one of their ships crashes on Ganymede.
 Approximately 100,000 years ago: hominids left behind on Minerva after genetic experimentation evolve into the Minervans–modern humans.
 Between 100,000 and 50,000 years ago: An ice age begins on Minerva, threatening to destroy the new human civilization. Humanity begins a space program in an attempt to escape the planet and migrate to Earth. This leads to conflict and an arms race between the inhabitants of Minerva's two continents, democratic Cerios and autocratic Lambia, over control of the program.
 50,020-50,000 years ago: The Jevlenese Imares Broghuilio and his generals appear via a time loop from the future in a fleet of five starships. Cerian president Harzin and Lambian king Perasmon declare the end of the arms race and the demilitarization of the two continents. Prince Freskel-Gar Engred is secretly aided by the Jevlenese in his plan to assassinate Perasmon and Harzin, and ascends the throne of Lambia. Under his rule, military development is restarted with contributions from Jevlenese technology. Broghuilio removes Freskel-Gar and installs himself as dictator, renaming himself Zargon. In turn, he too is replaced by Xerasky.
 50,000 years ago: After years of hostilities, total nuclear warfare finally breaks out between Cerios and Lambia on Minerva and at the Cerian base on Minerva's moon. The Thuriens intervene but are too late: Minerva is shattered, forming Pluto and the asteroid belt while its moon is captured by Earth—which originally had no moon—becoming the planet's familiar satellite. The Cerian survivors ask to be transported down onto Earth but the gravitational stresses of the Moon being captured by Earth throw their civilization back to the stone age and, to survive, they are forced to wipe out the native Neanderthals before attempting to rebuild. The Lambian survivors are resettled on the planet of Jevlen, near Thurien, in an attempt to reintegrate them into society. They set up the supercomputer of JEVEX to run their affairs, modelled after the Thurien computer VISAR.
 C. 50,000 years to the 19th century: The Jevlenese move JEVEX to the planet of Uttan so that their researchers can increase its power without the knowledge of the Thuriens. Unknown to both parties, a pocket universe forms within JEVEX, the Entoverse. Some of its sapient inhabitants ("Ents") who go by the title of ayatollahs devise the ability to pass over to the original universe by taking over the minds of the Jevlenese. The Thuriens begin to trust the Jevlenese and contract them with the task of observing human civilization. Still driven by hatred of their old rivals, the Jevlenese set about hindering human progress.
 19th century: In their attempt to destroy humanity, the Jevlenese begin to promote weapons research. In 1831, the Ent Sykha founds the Spiral of Awakening cult.
 1939-1945: The Jevlenese orchestrate World War II, believing that it will result in mutual nuclear annihilation.
 Post 1945: Earth begins a nuclear arms race after World War II, in accordance with the Jevlenese plan. Meanwhile, the Jevlenese leaders secretly build up their own stocks of weapons.
 1979: Birth of Joseph B. Shannon.
 1992: Birth of Victor Hunt.
 1999: Birth of Lyn Garland and Duncan Watt.
 2002: Birth of Hans Baumer.
 2015: With the looming threat of the Nucleonic bomb, the Cold War ends and the United Nations Space Arm (UNSA) is formed to promote peace and stability. Jevlenese agents help to demilitarize Earth though, to isolate Thurien, they continue to claim that Earth is on the brink of World War III.
 2027: Humanity begins to explore space once more. A UNSA mission finds a 50,000-year-old Cerian corpse, nicknamed Charlie, on the Moon. Scientists Victor Hunt and Christian Danchekker investigate the "Lunarians". (beginning of Inherit the Stars)
 2028: The former existence of Minerva is deduced. UNSA Expedition Jupiter 4 discovers the crashed Giants' starship on Ganymede and name the race the "Ganymeans".
 2029: Humanity reconstructs the full story of the Lunarians and the Ganymeans, discovers that the Moon was once Minerva's moon and finally realizes that Earthmen are the descendants of the Lunarians originating on Minerva. (end of Inherit the Stars)
 2030: The crew of the Shapieron have slowed down and re-enter the Solar System where they contact Humanity. They stay for six months but, rather than be alone in the universe, they set out once more to find the "Giant's Star". Humanity learns that their intelligence was an unintentional byproduct of the unsuccessful genetic experimentation of the Giants. The Jevlenese observers decline to inform Thurien of the reappearance of the Shapieron. Thurien learns of the Shapieron from a radio message sent by Earth (events of The Gentle Giants of Ganymede).
 2031: Unbeknownst to Jevlen, the Thuriens make radio contact with Earth and uncover the Jevlenese deception. Earth and Thurien unite against Jevlen, switching off JEVEX. Imares Broghuilio and his generals attempt to escape from Jevlen but are accidentally transferred into the past of another segment of the Multiverse, near the Minerva of 50,020 years before, in the process proving the Many-worlds interpretation. This discovery allows the Thuriens to begin to investigate the possibility of cross-Multiversal transfer. The now free Jevlen is on the brink of becoming a peaceful society when the deactivation of JEVEX causes the Ents to attempt an escape from the Entoverse. The ayatollah Eubeleus travels to Uttan, planning to switch JEVEX back on so that the Ents can flood into Jevlenese minds but is stopped by a coalition of humans and Thuriens, who isolate JEVEX on Uttan, preserving the Entoverse. (events of Giant's Star and Entoverse)
 2033: Victor Hunt is contacted by a version of himself from another segment of the Multiverse. A group of Terran and Thurien scientists invent the Multiporter, enabling cross-multiversal travel. (beginning of Mission to Minerva)
 2034: The Terrans and Thuriens on the Shapieron multiport to the 50,020-year past of the alternate universe in the Minerva Mission, an attempt to prevent the destruction of Minerva in that segment of the Multiverse and to initiate a new line of history. The Mission to Minerva proves successful and the Shapieron returns to its own universe. (end of Mission to Minerva)

Secondary Chronology
Events in this alternate chronology are identical up to 50,020 years ago. In this chronology, the Minerva Mission used timeline lensing generated by the Shapieron to cause the Jevlenese to disappear from the alternate timeline universe without a trace. Cerios and Lambia gave up the conflict and disarmed to concentrate on a space program for their mutual benefit. The Shapieron then returned to its own universe.

Books in the series
The series originally was planned as a trilogy published between 1977 and 1981 but was later expanded with Entoverse and Mission to Minerva.
 Inherit the Stars, May 1977, 
 The Gentle Giants of Ganymede, May 1978, 
 Giants' Star, July 1981, 
 Entoverse, October 1991, 
 Mission to Minerva, January 2005, 
Hogan remarked in his introduction to "The Two Worlds" that there was a possibility of a sixth book but added that there was "nothing definite in the works".

Omnibus editions
Several omnibus editions and collections of the novels were assembled during its run.
 The Minervan Experiment – November 1982 (an omnibus edition of the first three books of the Giants series)
 The Giants Novels: Inherit the Stars, The Gentle Giants of Ganymede, and Giants' Star – March 1994 (republication of The Minervan Experiment)
 The Two Moons - April 2006 (omnibus of the first two Giants novels)
 The Two Worlds - September 2007 (omnibus of the third and fourth Giants novels)

Reception
The reception of the series has been divided; the original trilogy is generally well received, while the later books have been seen as unnecessary additions,  suffering from many of the faults of Hogan's later work. In John Clute's article on Hogan's work, he first considered Inherit the Stars, noting "the exhilarating sense it conveys of scientific minds at work on real problems and ... the genuinely exciting scope of the sf imagination it deploys." However, he described the magical aspects of the Entoverse as "nonsense" and complained that the attempted rescue of Minerva was unsatisfying, adding that there was a "willingness on Hogan's part to re-activate sequences that had come to a natural halt." However, he concluded that "the sequence as a whole remains his best work."

James Nicoll remembered enjoying Inherit the Stars when he was a teenager but he had stopped reading the sequence after the first three books, as "[n]othing I have heard about Entoverse (the one I missed) makes me want to hunt it down." He went on to write a derisive early review of Mission to Minerva, where he concluded that "[o]verall, there was an ok novella trying to escape from this. Nothing in this book beyond the identity of the author required it to be so very, very bad."

In 1981, Inherit the Stars won the Seiun Award for Best Foreign Language Novel of the Year and Entoverse went on to win the 1994 Seiun Award in the same category.  A manga adaptation by Yukinobu Hoshino was published in 2011–2012 in Japan, which won the Seiun Award of Comics category in 2013.

References 

Science fiction book series
Novels about ancient astronauts
Prehistoric people in popular culture
Novels about parallel universes
Fiction about the Solar System
Novels set on the Moon
Xenoarchaeology in fiction